André Coelho Matos (14 September 1971 – 8 June 2019) was a Brazilian singer and musician. He was involved in the heavy metal bands Viper, Angra, Shaman and Symfonia. Since 2006, Matos had been dedicating his time to his solo career. In 2012, he was ranked No. 77 at the list of 100 Greatest Voices of Brazilian Music by Rolling Stone Brasil.

Biography

Viper, Angra and Shaman 
Matos grew up in his hometown of São Paulo. He began his musical education at the age of 10, when he received his first piano from his parents. As a teen, he would gather with his friends to listen to their favorite bands. Soon they began learning to play music too, and Matos joined his first band, Viper. The band first performed on 8 April 1985, when he was just 13 years old. That same year, they recorded their first demo tape, The Killera Sword.

Matos continued on vocals, but he had no intention of remaining a vocalist, a role he assumed only because his singing was the "least poor vocals of all of them", and because he physically resembled Iron Maiden's vocalist, Bruce Dickinson. His instruments of choice were always the piano and keyboard. Matos left Viper when the band began to change its musical style. He had become interested in classical music, and felt that his musical vision had begun to diverge from that of the other band members, who wanted to focus on heavier, "crude" music.

After leaving Viper, Matos went back to school and finished his education in music, specializing in orchestral conducting and music composition.

In 1991, Angra was formed, and with the first album, Angels Cry, released in 1993, the band became famous in Japan and Europe. Later, Holy Land and Fireworks were released. Angra's style evolved from a Helloween-inspired melodic speed metal to a unique blend of heavy-metal, classical music and traditional Brazilian influences which brought them worldwide critical praise.

In 2000, Matos left Angra alongside Luis Mariutti (bass) and Ricardo Confessori (drums) because of a disagreement with guitar players Rafael Bittencourt and Kiko Loureiro concerning the band's management.

Matos stayed with Mariutti and Confessori and recruited Mariutti's brother Hugo on guitar; together they formed the band Shaman. The band was a sudden success due to the song "Fairy Tale" which was featured in the Brazilian soap opera Beijo do Vampiro (Vampire Kiss). Their first album, Ritual, sold over 200.000 copies worldwide in the first year of its release and resulted in a tour with 150 concerts around the world and a DVD called Ritualive.

Their second release, Reason, kept the fame and culminated in a concert in front of 10,000 people in Rio de Janeiro. After this, the band owner and former Angra drummer Confessori fired Matos and Mariutti brothers from the band.

On 29 June 2018, Shaman announced a reunion of their original lineup to tour in celebration of their 17th anniversary.

Solo records Time to Be Free and Mentalize 
Prior to his death, Matos was carrying his solo career on along with Mariutti brothers, but he often said that calling it a solo career was a big mistake; it was a band with his name, and they all decided so due to the fame of his name around the world and the frequent departure from other bands. Their first album, Time to Be Free (2007), a themed album with lyrics focused on Matos' departure from Shaman, is considered the most symphonic record written by Matos. The album charted well both in Brazil and Europe and was a success in the eyes of both critics and fans.

Time to Be Free is a more personal album, even though guitarist Hugo Mariutti wrote almost every song along with Matos and Pit Passarel, an ex-band partner of Matos in Viper, who was also a guest in this album. Besides all success heading the release of the album and the expectation over the album, Matos decided not to record any worldwide video clips; he only recorded and released an exclusive video clip for the Japanese audience which features a cover.

Time to Be Free was followed by a tour with more than 50 concerts all over the world; Matos was invited to tour with Scorpion and Edguy (an old friend, and this friendship began when Matos was in Angra and Edguy was invited to be the front act for Angra's Fireworks tour), taking place in Europe, Brazil and Japan, and in festivals like Loud Park, Live and Louder, and Finnish Metal Expo. Matos was also called to be headliner in ProgPower USA, but due to problems with their passport, they canceled the concert; he was replaced by another Brazilian band called MindFlow. At the end of the tour, Matos joined Hangar (a up-and-coming Brazilian metal band) to a metal Christmas project, before returning to the studio to record his new album.

Mentalize was released in Brasil and Japan first, at the end of 2009, and a tour started in Brazil, with concerts in Rio de Janeiro, Recife, São Paulo, Fortaleza, and some other cities. It was released in early 2010 in Europe, so Matos would profit to play in some summer festivals. Mentalize was produced by Corciolli, and mixed by Sascha Paeth.

Collaboration with Avantasia and Symfonia 

In 2001, Matos was one of the guests on Tobias Sammet's metal opera Avantasia, playing the part of 'Elderane the Elf' in the Metal Opera albums. He was also part of their first world tour in 2008 as one of the main guests. In 2010, he was featured in the album The Wicked Symphony providing vocals for "Blizzard on a Broken Mirror". Matos is also featured on the live album/DVD The Flying Opera. His last appearance with Avantasia was in São Paulo on 2 June 2019, a few days before his death.

In November 2010, Matos joined Symfonia, a power metal supergroup formed in with Timo Tolkki, Uli Kusch, Jari Kainulainen, and Mikko Härkin. They made their debut performance at Finnish Metal Expo 2011 and released their first and only album In Paradisum. As touring and second album plans didn't work as planned, Timo Tolkki (guitarist, ex-Stratovarius) announced that he would stop his life in the music industry and that Symfonia would not continue as a band.

Reunion with Viper and Shaman 

On 20 April 2012, it was announced that Matos had returned to his former band Viper to make a reunion tour to celebrate the 25-year anniversary of the band's debut album, Soldiers of Sunrise. The band played its first two albums, Soldiers of Sunrise and Theatre of Fate, live in their entirety. After that, the solo band and Viper joined each other on the secondary stage of the biggest Brazilian festival, Rock in Rio, for a special concert and opening act for Helloween and Iron Maiden.

On 29 June 2018, Shaman made a reunion of their original lineup to tour in celebration of their 17th anniversary. In February 2019, Shaman were announced as a special guest with Avantasia in Brazilian concerts.

Death 
Matos died on June 8, 2019, aged 47. The death was announced by a note published on social networks and signed by the members of the band Shaman. The media confirmed the news through members and press agents of the band. 

It was later confirmed that Andre Matos passed away due to an heart attack. As a wish manifested in his life, there was no public wake and the singer's body was cremated in an undisclosed location.

On July 13, 2019, the mayor of São Paulo, Bruno Covas, officially declared June 8th as São Paulo's Heavy Metal Day.

André Matos band members 
André Matos – vocals, keyboards, piano
João Milliet – guitars
Hugo Mariutti – guitars
Bruno Ladislau – bass guitar
Rodrigo Silveira – drums

Former members 
Eloy Casagrande – drums
Rafael Rosa – drums
Luís Mariutti – bass guitar
Fabio Ribeiro – keyboards
Andre Hernandes – guitars

Discography

Solo career 

Time to Be Free – 2007
Mentalize – 2009
The Turn of the Lights – 2012
Moonlight: The Best of Andre Matos (compilation) – 2019
 "Life Goes On" (single) – 2020

Viper 

Soldiers of Sunrise – 1987
Theatre of Fate – 1989
 All My Life (special guest)  – 2007
To Live Again: Ao Vivo Em São Paulo – 2015
The Spreading Soul Forever Single – 2020

Angra 

Angels Cry – 1993
Evil Warning (EP) – 1994
Live Acoustic at FNAC – 1995
Holy Land – 1996
Freedom Call (EP) – 1996
Holy Live – 1998
Fireworks – 1998
Best Reached Horizons (compilation) – 2012

Virgo 

Virgo – 2001

Shaman 

Ritual – 2002
RituAlive (live album) – 2003
Reason – 2005
Video Clip Reason – 2020

Symfonia 

In Paradisum – 2011

Other participations 
Nepal – Manifiesto – 1996
Looking-Glass-Self – Equinox – 1998
Superior – Younique (album) – 1998
Time Machine – Secret Oceans Part II – 1998
Sagrado Coração da Terra – Ao Oeste do Sol, Oeste da Lua – 2000
Rodrigo Alves – Suddenly – 2000
Hamlet – William Shakespeare's Hamlet – 2001
Holy Sagga – Planetude – 2001
Karma – Into the Eyes – 2001
Henceforth – I.Q.U. – 2001
Avantasia – (The Metal Opera) Parts I & II – 2001 / 2002
Avalanch – Los Poetas Han Muerto – 2002
Luca Turilli – Prophet of the Last Eclipse – 2002
Dr. Sin – Ten Years Live – 2003
AINA – Days of Rising Doom – 2004
Thalion – Another Sun – 2004
Epica – Consign to Oblivion – 2005
Eyes of Shiva – Deep – 2006
Viper – All My Life – 2007
Clairvoyants – Word to the Wise – 2008
HDK – System Overload – 2009
Corciolli – Lightwalk – 2009
Avantasia – The Wicked Symphony – 2010
Avantasia – The Flying Opera (live album) – 2011
My Alley – Hope – 2011
Trick or Treat – "Prince With 1000 Enemies" – 2012
Empürios – Cyclings – 2013
Art X – The Redemption of Cain – 2016
Soulspell – The Second Big Bang – 2017
Soulspell – 10 Years of Soul – 2019
Dune Hill – Song of Seikilos – 2020

Filmography 

 André Matos: Maestro do Rock – 2021

Bibliography 
 André Matos: O Maestro do Heavy Metal – 2020

References

External links 
Official website (archived)

1971 births
Angra (band) members
Brazilian heavy metal singers
2019 deaths
Musicians from São Paulo
21st-century Brazilian male singers
21st-century Brazilian singers
Brazilian heavy metal keyboardists
Brazilian pianists
English-language singers from Brazil
Child rock musicians
Male pianists
20th-century Brazilian male singers
20th-century Brazilian singers
Viper (band) members
Shaman (band) members
21st-century pianists
Symfonia members